Horozköy railway station is a station in Manisa, Turkey. Located in the Faith neighborhood in east Manisa, Horozköy consists of a side platform servicing one track. TCDD Taşımacılık operates two daily trains that stop at the station, with three other trains that do not.

Horozköy station was originally built in 1865 by the Smyrna Cassaba Railway.

Gallery

References

External links
Station timetable

Railway stations in Manisa Province
1865 establishments in the Ottoman Empire
Railway stations opened in 1865
Manisa